Flex Your Head is a sampler album featuring early hardcore punk bands from the Washington, D.C. area. It was originally released in January 1982 on Dischord Records, with a pressing of 4,000 copies on vinyl record that sold out within one week; an additional 3,000 copies were released shortly after. In 1982, a third pressing of 2,000 copies was released under license in the United Kingdom by Alternative Tentacles. Each of the first three pressings featured a different front cover.

Background
The compilation takes its title from the Minor Threat lyric shouted in the song "12XU", included on the album, originally by the English band Wire.

Dischord assembled Flex Your Head as a way to record the many punk bands that had started up, and sometimes also ceased, in the previous years in the D.C. area. The album served as either a debut or sophomore release for every band on it except Minor Threat, for whom it was their third.

At the time of the album's release not only had most of the bands on it already have broken up, but many had gone on to start other bands, some of those bands also appear on the album. The Teen Idles had broken up in late 1980 and by the time of the release of Flex Your Head members had already started Minor Threat and Youth Brigade. The Untouchables broke up in 1981 and with the former members joining a multitude of bands including The Faith, The Warmers, Rites of Spring, One Last Wish, Skewbald, Happy Go Licky, Youth Brigade, and The Meatmen. State of Alert had also folded in early 1981 as singer Henry Garfield had joined Black Flag. Minor Threat had disbanded (although they would reunite a few months after the album's release) and since then Ian MacKaye and Jeff Nelson had founded Skewbald while Lyle Preslar joined an early version of Big Black. Youth Brigade and Red C both existed solely during 1981, and both Artificial Peace and Deadline would break up within a few months of the release of Flex Your Head, aside from Youth Brigade these band's only recorded output is on the compilation, though from those bands would come the longer lasting Beefeater, Marginal Man and Fugazi. Only Government Issue and Iron Cross would survive past the next year.

The songs "12XU" and "Steppin' Stone" were extremely popular covers in the D.C. punk scene. "Steppin' Stone", which was performed by State of Alert on this album, was also covered by Minor Threat on their second EP In My Eyes, while the song "12XU" was so commonly covered that several shows would have multiple bands playing their renditions.

Recording
Flex Your Head was recorded between April 1980 and December 1981. The Teen Idles, Untouchables, and Red C songs were recorded at Hit and Run Studios with engineer Steve Carr, Iron Cross' tracks were recorded at C.A.B. Studios with engineer Tom Scott, while all the other songs were recorded at Inner Ear Studios with engineer Don Zientara.

Cover art
While the back cover of Flex Your Head has remained almost the same, its front cover has changed throughout the years. When the album was first released, featured a stock photography of a painting of a violin, roses, and sheet music. The second pressing, released almost immediately, came with a stock image of stalks of wheat. A third early cover, designed by Jeff Nelson and used for the British pressing of the album, displayed a black and white version of the flag of Washington, D.C. with the stars replaced by Xs. Later, in 1985, the record was re-released with a new cover featuring a blurry photo of a man in a hat, which was used until 2008. The most recent version, a variation in red and white of the D.C. flag cover from 1982, came in 2010 on a remastered LP re-release.

The CD editions of the album came with all versions of the front cover to be used interchangeably.

Critical reception
Justin M. Norton, contributor at the online magazine Stereogum, was of the view that:

Reissues
Flex Your Head was re-released on CD in August 1993.

A remastered CD version was released in 2002.

Track listing

Personnel

The Teen Idles
 Nathan Strejcek – vocals
 Geordie Grindle – guitar
 Ian MacKaye – bass
 Jeff Nelson – drums

Untouchables
 Alec MacKaye – vocals
 Eddie Janney – guitar
 Bert Queiroz – bass
 Rich Moore – drums

State of Alert
 Henry Garfield − vocals
 Michael Hampton − guitar
 Wendel Blow − bass
 Simon Jacobsen − drums

Minor Threat
 Ian MacKaye – vocals
 Lyle Preslar – guitar
 Brian Baker – bass
 Jeff Nelson – drums

Government Issue
 John Stabb – vocals
 John Barry – guitar
 Brian Gay – bass
 Marc Alberstadt – drums

Youth Brigade
 Nathan Strejcek – vocals
 Tom Clinton – guitar
 Bert Queiroz – bass
 Danny Ingram – drums

Red C
 Eric L. – vocals
 Pete Murray – guitar
 Toni Young – bass
 Tomas Squip – drums

Void
 John Weiffenbach – vocals
 Bubba Dupree – guitar
 Chris Stover – bass
 Sean Finnegan – drums

Iron Cross
 Sab Grey – vocals
 Mark Haggerty – guitar
 Wendle Blow – bass
 Dante Ferrando – drums

Artificial Peace
 Steve Polcari – vocals
 Pete Murray – guitar
 Rob Moss – bass
 Mike Manos – drums

Deadline
 Ray Hare – vocals 
 Christian Caron – guitar 
 Terry Scanlon – bass 
 Brendan Canty – drums

Notes

References

Further reading
 Blush, Steven (2001). "Minor Threat & DC: Flex Your Head". American Hardcore: A Tribal History. Second ed., 2010. Feral House. . pp. 149–176.
 Hurchalla, George (Zuo Press, 2005). "Wild in the Streets". Going Underground: American Punk 1979–1989. Second ed., 2016. Oakland: PM Press. . pp. 105–111.

External links
 Flex Your Head. Dischord Records.
 Norton, Justin M. (October 17, 2012). "13 Essential DC Hardcore Albums: Various Artists - Flex Your Head (Dischord, 1982)". Stereogum.
 Flex Your Head. Discogs.

1982 compilation albums
Hardcore punk compilation albums
Dischord Records compilation albums